Utama is a 2022 internationally co-produced drama film directed by Alejandro Loayza Grisi in his directorial debut film. It premiered at the Sundance Film Festival on January 22, 2022 and was released in French theaters on May 11, 2022. It was selected as the Bolivian entry for the 95th Academy Awards at the Best International Feature Film.

Plot 
An elderly Quechua-speaking couple lives in the Altiplano, the arid highlands of the Andes, and the sick Virginio, knowing that he is about to die, spends his last days hiding this condition from his wife Sisa. A long life together hides behind the Quechua couple.

Together they are busy with tasks like grazing their llamas. His house is surrounded by high mountains. Virginio often looks at the sky and hopes that it will rain. Since it doesn't rain and the village well is empty, Sisa has to walk to the river every day. Women from surrounding villages also flock to the last remaining spring.

One day they receive a visit from their grandson Clever, who brings news from the city. His grandparents conspicuously argue in Quechua over Clever's motives for visiting, he speaks to them in Spanish. Clever wants his grandparents to pack up and move with the family to the city, where the sick Virginio can be examined and treated.  

Clever and Virginio go to the mountains with nearby villagers and they perform a ritual to bring rain back to the land. Afterwards the frustrated villagers debate the solutions to their drought, many opting to leave to the city. 

During his shepherding Virginio falls unconscious. Clever finds him and brings him back to a worried Sisa, who asks him to disclose his mysterious cough. Virginio worries that Sisa will be alone, once he passes and he would rather have her come with him to the afterlife than to move to the city. Clever confronts him about his selfishness, they argue and Clever leaves the village. He returns not much later with a doctor, who tries to convince Virginio to come to the city to get treated. A defeated Virginio refuses. He remains silent about dying but encounters many motifs around death including a dehydrated llama, a condor, and the news of Clever becoming a father, which he overhears. Virginio discretely makes plans to give Clever a tin box filled with photos and bits of gold. He gives Clever his hat the day before he peacefully dies in his sleep. 

The neighboring villagers attend his funeral. Clever gets ready to leave back to the city, he says goodbye to Sisa and she asks him to visit her often. Under the thundering sky the widowed Sisa shepherds the llamas.

Release 
The first screenings of the film took place on January 22, 2022 at the Sundance Film Festival. It was released in French cinemas on May 11, 2022. At the end of June 2022 it was shown at the Munich Film Festival. The film was released in Swiss cinemas on June 23, 2022. In early July 2022, the film was shown at the Karlovy Vary International Film Festival in the Horizons section and in late July 2022 at the New Horizons International Film Festival. Performances at the Leipzig Film Art Fair are scheduled for September 2022. In October 2022 it will be presented at the Vancouver International Film Festival and the Busan International Film Festival. The film is scheduled to hit German cinemas in January 2023.

Reception

Critical reception

Accolades

See also 

 List of submissions to the 95th Academy Awards for Best International Feature Film
 List of Bolivian submissions for the Academy Award for Best International Feature Film

References

External links 
 
 

2022 films
2022 directorial debut films
2022 drama films
Bolivian drama films
Uruguayan drama films
French drama films
Quechua-language films
2020s Spanish-language films
Films shot in Bolivia
Films set in Bolivia
Films about old age
Films about families